The Parish Church of St Mary and St Augustine in Stamford, Lincolnshire, England, is home to a congregation of the Roman Catholic Diocese of Nottingham. St Augustine's (as it is generally known) was designed in a "robust High Victorian Early English" style by George Goldie, one of the foremost Catholic architects in England in the nineteenth century. It was built over 1862-64 and while much of its Victorian interior was stripped out in the middle decades of the twentieth century, it still retains some furnishings and fittings of distinction.

Foundation and exterior

The church (originally Our Lady & St Augustine, following continental Catholic practice and described as such by Nikolaus Pevsner) was built on the north side of Stamford's Broad Street on the site of the Dolphin public house. It replaced an earlier place of worship, a chapel in the Gothic style situated in All Saints Street, which functioned between 1834 and 1864 and which in the 1830s was one of only six Catholic chapels in Lincolnshire. Prior to this, during the anti-Catholic penal laws, Mass had been celebrated secretly in some of Stamford's numerous cellars, in particular, that of no. 24, High Street St Martin's. The first resident parish priest of this post-Reformation parish, between 1833 and 1838, was William Wareing, who  in 1850 became the first  Bishop of Northampton on the Restoration of the Catholic Hierarchy.

The dedication to St Augustine of Canterbury, perhaps reflected the pro-English predilections of the patrons of the new building – in particular Charles Ormston Eaton, a local banker and resident of Tolethorpe Hall and Charles Noel, 2nd Earl of Gainsborough (both part of the wave of 19th-century converts to Catholicism that followed the Oxford Movement; most 19th-century Catholic communities, in contrast, had a distinctly Irish flavour).

The church comprises a nave, a two-bay 'north' aisle with round, Romanesque arches, a canted sanctuary, small south chapel with apse and north porch. It is accompanied by a presbytery (priest's house) and parish school (added in 1870 and also by Goldie) built around a small garden facing Broad Street. The Stamford Mercury anticipated the church would be "the prettiest modern Gothic erection in the town" and, subsequently, "…taking the size of the town into consideration, probably equal to any erected in England in modern times". It enthused that "the altar and reredos…are beautiful specimens of art-work…of Caen stone. The former is enriched with gold monograms of Our Lady & St Austin to whom the church is dedicated, encircled by the pretty ball-flower ornament, the panels being divided by shafts of serpentine marble supporting exquisitely wrought foliated capitals… The reredos terminates in a symbolically foliated finial extending to the lofty open roof. The panels, which are as rich as the finest sculpture of angels (in bas relief) can render them, are also divided by black marble shafts, the rich tabernacle, for the reception of the shrine projecting from the centre. The church is lighted with four corona or stars of 15 gas jets each, the effect of which upon the altar and reredos and the numerous accessories they contain is gorgeous and is consequently very imposing…" Pevsner reviewed the building without much enthusiasm however – albeit at a time when Victoriana was not highly thought of. He described the church's little campanile as "an unbelievable bell-turret, asymmetically placed and most crudely detailed" although it does provides a focus to the vista facing east from the middle of Broad Street and "is the external focus of the building".

On the church's gable end is carved a representation of the Medieval seal of the Borough of Stamford, displaying a burgess kneeling before an image of the Virgin Mary and Child Jesus, surrounded by the Latin motto: Stanford Burgenses Virgo Fundant Tibi Preces  that is: "To Thee, O Virgin, the Burgesses of Stamford Pour Out Prayers."  This seal had been unused in Stamford since the English Reformation although an example can be found in the collection of the British Museum.

The church's formal opening on 6 June 1865 was reported at length in the Mercury. Four bishops participated in the ceremony – Roskell of Nottingham, Amherst of Northampton, the retired William Wareing and Grant of Southwark, as well as the mitred abbot of Mount St Bernard Abbey in Leicestershire, attended by thirty further clergy. The bishops were "invested in rich copes and mitres… [and] formed a very imposing spectacle" and High Mass was "celebrated with considerable splendour". After the ceremony Charles Ormston Eaton presided over a celebratory lunch at the George Hotel where besides the clergy and the architect, Goldie, other guests included the Marchioness of Lothian, a Lady Fitzgerald and various local dignitaries, before the party returned to church at 3pm for Benediction and a sermon by an eminent Jesuit preacher from London.

The final cost of church and presbytery, as evidenced by Goldie's invoice, amounted to £2,296, 0s, 6d.

Internal furnishings
Inside, despite some attempts in the past to dispose of it, a large mid-nineteenth century statue of the Madonna and Child by Franz Mayer & Co. of Munich stands in the small Lady Chapel that Goldie had designed expressly for the purpose. This statue was a gift of the recusant Lamb family of Axwell Park, County Durham.

Other fittings include stained glass windows by William Wailes, an associate of Pugin who exhibited at The Great Exhibition, which were installed in St Joseph's chapel in 1873-4, to some acclaim. The organ, by J. W. Walker & Sons Ltd, was donated in 1866 by Charles Ormston Eaton and remains in full working order, and the church's bell, a tenor G, was cast by John Taylor & Co of Loughborough and placed in the campanile in 1871. The Victorian stencilled and painted sanctuary ceiling was executed in 1874 with parts, notably the main beam, perhaps by Christopher Dresser.

Much of the church's most elaborate neo-Gothic furnishings were removed in a zealous, post-War refurbishment of 1951. The remainder, including the large stone altar with its porphyry columns, and the terracotta altar rails by Messrs Blashfield of Stamford, were swept away in another extensive re-development of 1982 (although a fragment of the latter remains within the Lady Chapel). The current sanctuary arrangement and freestanding altar of Collyweston stone date from the 1982 refurbishment. In the Lady Chapel are the remains of a First World War memorial unaccountably destroyed in 1951. Its only remaining panel commemorates a Captain Fenwick. Other fittings, including a solid gold late Georgian chalice and paten set, and an elaborate neo-Gothic silver gilt monstrance were disposed of around the turn of the 21st century.

Of post-War additions, the building's extensive, high-quality linenfold panelling, produced by Bowmans of Stamford, was completed in 1945. The hand-carved wooden stations of the cross were donated at the end of the Second World War by American servicemen stationed locally to commemorate their residence in the area, and as a memorial to those who had died in the two World Wars, and St Joseph's Chapel, in particular the ceiling, was re-designed by Lawrence Bond, architect of Grantham, and conservator of Lincoln Cathedral.

St Augustine's suffered considerable depredations in the second half of the twentieth century entirely at the hands of its custodians, although considerable efforts have been made in recent years to restore some of the building's Victorian features. Since Goldie's other works included Cardinal Manning's Our Lady of Victories, Kensington and the Cathedral of the Immaculate Conception, Sligo, and could be found elsewhere across England, Scotland and Ireland, and even as far afield as Durban, South Africa, St Augustine's remains one of the few Victorian buildings in Stamford designed by an architect of more than merely local reputation.

References

Further reading
Simon Stanley, A History of the Roman Catholic Community of Stamford 2000.

Roman Catholic churches in Lincolnshire
Saints Mary and Augustine
Roman Catholic churches completed in 1864
Gothic Revival church buildings in England
Gothic Revival architecture in Lincolnshire
George Goldie church buildings
19th-century Roman Catholic church buildings in the United Kingdom